Buccinum plectrum is a species of sea snail, a marine gastropod mollusk in the family Buccinidae, the true whelks.

Description
The size of an adult shell varies between 50 mm and 100 mm.

Distribution
This species is distributed in the Northwest Atlantic Ocean, along Northeast Canada and along Alaska.

References

 Brunel, P., L. Bosse, and G. Lamarche. 1998. Catalogue of the marine invertebrates of the estuary and Gulf of St. Lawrence. Canadian Special Publication of Fisheries and Aquatic Sciences, 126. 405 p

External links
 

Buccinidae
Gastropods described in 1865